The Hualien Martyrs' Shrine is a martyrs' shrine in Hualien City, Hualien County, Taiwan.

History

The site was originally established as Karenkō Shrine during the Japanese rule of Taiwan on 19 August 1915. Due to the switch of diplomatic relations by Japan from the Republic of China to the People's Republic of China in 1972, there was an anti-Japanese sentiment in the island, which led to the demolishing of Japan-built buildings around Taiwan. In 1981, the shrine was demolished to make way for the construction of Hualien Martyrs' Shrine.

Transportation
The site is accessible within walking distance south east of Hualien Station of Taiwan Railways.

See also
 Eternal Spring Shrine
 Karenkō Shrine
 Xiangde Temple

References

1915 establishments in Taiwan
Buildings and structures in Hualien County
Hualien City
Martyrs' shrines in Taiwan